Neißemünde (Neissemuende, literally Mouth of the Neisse river) is a municipality in the Oder-Spree district, in Brandenburg, Germany. It belongs to the Amt ("collective municipality") Neuzelle, which has its administrative seat in the neighbouring Neuzelle municipality.

Geography
The municipal area is located in the historic Lower Lusatia region, close to the border with Żytowań in Poland. Near the village of Ratzdorf, the Lusatian Neisse discharges into the Oder River. Both rivers mark the German eastern border along the Oder–Neisse line.

Subdivision
Since 31 December 2001, the Neißemünde municipality consists of the following four villages:
 Breslack
 Coschen (Kóšyna)
 Ratzdorf
 Wellmitz

History
Archaeological excavations of Globular Amphora culture artifacts denote a settlement of the area since the Neolithic. The region along the Oder and Neisse rivers was settled by Polabian Slavs (Sorbs) from about 600 onwards and in 965 became part of the Imperial March of Lusatia. The village of Wellmitz was first mentioned in a 1300 deed issued by Margrave Theoderic IV. The estates then belonged to the Cistercian abbey of Neuzelle, confirmed by Emperor Charles IV in 1370.

In 1846 Wellmitz and Coschen were connected to the Lower Silesian-Mark Railway line from Berlin to Breslau. The village of Ratzdorf was heavily affected by the 1997 Central European flood; reconstruction was funded, inter alia, through a substantial donation by US singer Michael Jackson.

Demography

References

External links

 Official site Amt Neuzelle

Localities in Oder-Spree